The Carlsberg Research Laboratory is a private scientific research center in Copenhagen, Denmark under the Carlsberg Group. It was founded in 1875 by J. C. Jacobsen, the founder of the Carlsberg brewery, with the purpose of advancing biochemical knowledge, especially relating to brewing. It featured a Department of Chemistry and a Department of Physiology. In 1972, the laboratory was renamed the Carlsberg Research Center and was transferred to the brewery.

Overview
The Carlsberg Laboratory was known for isolating Saccharomyces carlsbergensis, the species of yeast responsible for lager fermentation, as well as introducing the concept of pH in acid-base chemistry. The Danish chemist Søren Peder Lauritz Sørensen introduced the concept of pH, a scale for measuring acidity and basicity of substances. While working at the Carlsberg Laboratory, he studied the effect of ion concentration on proteins, and understood the concentration of hydrogen ions was particularly important. To express the hydronium ion (H3O+) concentration in a solution, he devised a logarithmic scale known as the pH scale.

Directors

See also
 Emil Christian Hansen
 Kirstine Smith
 Carsten Olsen
 Carlsberg
 J. C. Jacobsen
 Carlsberg Foundation
 Søren Anton van der Aa Kühle
 Morten P. Meldal

Footnotes

References

Further reading

External links
Carlsberg Research Laboratory

Research institutes in Denmark
Organizations established in 1875
1875 establishments in Denmark
Organizations based in Copenhagen
Carlsberg Group
Yeast banks